Triphenylethanol, or 1,1,2-triphenylethanol, is an organic compound with a condensed structural formula of , and is related to triphenylethylene, from which it can be prepared by hydration. It is the structural analog of two drugs, the never-marketed antiestrogen ethamoxytriphetol (MER-25) and the withdrawn lipid-lowering agent triparanol, as both contain the 1,1,2-triphenylethanol moiety within their structure.

There are three isomeric compounds with a "triphenylethanol" structure:
 1,1,2-triphenylethanol;

References

Tertiary alcohols
Phenyl compounds